Elling Enger (22 February 1905 - 28 January 1979) was a Norwegian composer, organist, and choir conductor.

Biography 
Enger was born in Skotfoss, Norway, and got his musical educated at the Conservatory of Music in Oslo. He worked as organist in Tromsø (1930–36), and later as organist and choir conductor in Oslo. He has written the song "Bli med, bli med til livet!" ("Join, join in to life!"), as well as cantatas, orchestra pieces, motets, organ works, and the like.

References

External links 
Biography at Store Norske Leksikon

Norwegian classical organists
Male classical organists
Norwegian male classical composers
20th-century Norwegian composers
Norwegian classical composers
20th-century classical composers
Norwegian contemporary classical composers
Norwegian Academy of Music alumni
Musicians from Skien
1905 births
1979 deaths
20th-century organists
20th-century Norwegian male musicians